Standard Asiatic Oil Company Limited is a Bangladeshi government owned oil company under Bangladesh Petroleum Corporation. The company sells aviation fuel, bitumen, diesel oil, furnace Oil, and LP gas.

History 
Standard Asiatic Oil Company Limited was established in 1965 as a joint venture of Asiatic Industries Limited and Esso.

After the Independence of Bangladesh in 1972, Esso left the company and their shares were taken over by the government of Bangladesh. The shares of Esso given to Bangladesh Petroleum Corporation, under the Ministry of Power, Energy and Mineral Resources, which now owns 50 per cent of Standard Asiatic Oil Company Limited.

The Daily Star reported in 2019, that parent company of Standard Asiatic Oil Company Limited, Asiatic Oil Company Limited, had embezzled money from Standard Asiatic Oil. One billion taka from Standard Asiatic Oil Company Limited was funned into Asiatic Oil Company Limited, Goodwin Power Limited, and Pyramid Exim Limited.

In August 2022, Standard Asiatic Oil Company Limited handed over the contract to supply Cox's Bazar aviation depot at Cox's Bazar Airport to Padma Oil Company, another subsidiary of Bangladesh Petroleum Corporation. Only Standard Asiatic Oil and Eastern Refinery Limited store oil condensate in Bangladesh.

The Daily Star reported that a technical officer was hired with a class eight certificate in a position that requires a bachelors in engineering. He was recruited without a job posting, test, or interview. An audit of the company found 14 individuals were hired similarly. In November 2022, Justices Md. Nazrul Islam Talukder, and Khizir Hayat of Bangladesh High Court ordered Comptroller and Auditor General and Bangladesh Petroleum Corporation to investigate Standard Asiatic Oil Company Limited over 4.72 billion taka irregularities. The High Court issued the verdict following a report on The Daily Star. According to a report of the Comptroller and Auditor General the company had embezzled 4.72 billion taka and the report found the involvement of company director Moinuddin Ahmed who represented Asiatic Oil Company Limited. The Anti Corruption Commission had found Moinuddin Ahmed had used the embezzled money to purchase properties in Dhaka and Chittagong. Mohammed Shahed, general manager of the company, was also found involved in the irregularities according to the investigative report.

References 

1965 establishments in East Pakistan
Conglomerate companies of Bangladesh
Government-owned companies of Bangladesh
Organisations based in Chittagong